These are a series of lists reality television shows as it has split into two articles:

 List of reality television show franchises (A–G)
 List of reality television show franchises (H–Z)

See also
 List of television show franchises
 Media franchise